Ira Stadlen (January 16, 1924 – April 18, 2010), known professionally as Allen Swift, was an American voice actor, best known for voicing cartoon characters Simon Bar Sinister and Riff-Raff on the Underdog cartoon show. He took his professional name from radio comedian Fred Allen and 18th century satirist Jonathan Swift.

Career

Children's TV host
Captain Alan Swift was an early television star who hosted The Popeye Show from September 10, 1956, to September 23, 1960, until he was forced to leave the program due to creative differences with station management. But he later became a children's television show host named "Captain Allen" on WPIX in New York City.

Cartoon voices
Swift is best known for providing the fiendish voices for the cartoon villains Simon Bar Sinister and Riff-Raff on the Underdog cartoon show. He voiced for the cartoon character, Clint Clobber.  He also voiced many of the characters in The Bluffers, the 1960s underwater puppet show Diver Dan, and Gene Deitch's 1961–1962 group of Tom and Jerry cartoons. According to Mopar Magazine, he was also the voice of "Tech" for their series of service training films providing color commentary and dry humor to help keep things digestible and interesting. He also voiced his talents for Sesame Street.

Rankin/Bass
In addition, Swift provided the majority of the voices in Rankin/Bass's Mad Monster Party?, credited as Alan (sic) Swift in the movie's credits. He was also in other Rankin/Bass productions including the TV special The Enchanted World of Danny Kaye: The Emperor's New Clothes as the voice of Musty.

Howdy Doody
Swift supplied most of the character voices for the NBC Howdy Doody Show. When Buffalo Bob Smith—who himself did the voice of the lead puppet character Howdy Doody and had many times proclaimed that "nobody else could do Howdy"—suffered a heart attack, Swift took home some recordings over the weekend, came back on Monday, and supplied Howdy's voice for more than a year.

Writing
Swift became the second comedy writer for Howdy Doody following the abrupt departure of the series' first comedy writer and songwriter, Edward Kean. He also wrote the play Checking Out.

Commercials and MAD Magazine
Swift provided the original voice of the Frito Bandito in the animated Fritos Corn Chips commercials of the 1960s. In the 1970s and 1980s, he was the talking drain on Drano television commercials, and he impersonated Carroll O'Connor as Archie Bunker and Adolf Hitler as "Dolf" on MAD Magazine's vinyl insert recording of "Gall in the Family Fare," the All in the Family satire that ran in the magazine's Super Special No. 11 in 1973. He also played Captain Cupcake in the Hostess Brands commercials.

Personal life
Swift was married to actress Lenore Loveman, and is the father of character actor, mimic and singer Lewis J. Stadlen, holistic health practitioner Maxime Zahra, and psychotherapist Clare A. Stadlen.  He resided in Manhattan. He was also a gifted figurative painter, creating and exhibiting landscapes and figures reminiscent of those of artists Leland Bell and Fairfield Porter.

Death
Swift had been "suffering with a series of health calamities for several years, since he fell and broke his hip while walking his dog. From that moment, one thing led to another," said personal friend and director Gene Deitch. "Even though [I've been] here for 50 years, hardly a year went by without a visit to his 57th Street apartment, nor a day go by without e-mail and most recently Skype visits," added Deitch, an American expatriate living in the Czech Republic.

Allen Swift died at his home on April 18, 2010. Cremated.

Filmography

References

External links

1924 births
2010 deaths
American male voice actors
Jubilee Records artists
Male actors from New York City
American television hosts
20th-century American male actors